Comprehensive Physiology is a peer-reviewed scientific journal published by John Wiley & Sons on behalf of the American Physiological Society.

The journal consists of invited review articles, published in quarterly issues, and includes over 30,000 pages of the APS's Handbook of Physiology series of books, scanned and presented online for the first time.

The journal is indexed in PubMed, and Web of Knowledge.

References 

 Sherratt Chris. "Comprehensive Physiology is now online!" MIT Library News, MIT. Accessdate: 19 July 2013.
 unibathlibrary.wordpress.com. "Comprehensive Physiology Online" The Library, University of Bath. Accessdate: 19 July 2013.

External links 

Biology journals
Quarterly journals
English-language journals